Haydarköy can refer to the following villages in Turkey:

 Haydarköy, Alaca
 Haydarköy, İvrindi
 Haydarköy, Mut